Apaman is a 1988 Indian Bengali film bankrolled by Screen & Publicities and directed by Chandan Mukherjee with a musical score by Robin Banerjee.Prosenjit, Jayasri Roy, Tarun Kumar, Sandhyarani and Abhijith Sen appeared in the lead roles.

Cast 
 Prosenjit
 Jayasri Roy
 Tarun Kumar
 Abhijit Sen
 Sandhya Rani
 Shekhar Chattopadhyay
 Indrani Dutta
 Sailen Mukhopadhyay
 Lolita Chattopadhyay
 Master Manku
 Master Sudip

References 

Bengali-language Indian films
1980s Bengali-language films